Grand Wing Servo-Tech Co., Ltd. or GWS is a Taiwanese manufacturer of foam radio controlled aircraft and accessories, including their own line of electric motors, servos, radio systems and gyros.  In the U.S., the company is known as Grand Wing System with headquarters in City of Industry, California.

GWS was founded in 1993 and has quickly risen to become one of the leading manufacturers of RC products with sales in 2004 of more than US$12,000,000.

The company designs and manufactures all of its own products in their own factories in both Taiwan and China, while mainly in China by now.  This allows GWS to be an original equipment manufacturer as well, with custom tooling and development available.

GWS USA, LLC was established in January 2004 to improve distribution of GWS products in North America.  The division handles sales, warranty, claims and partial repairs for the entire North American market as well. GWS headquarters in Taiwan and subsidiary GWS China take care of claims for the rest of the world.

"Tiger Moth World Tour"

A GWS Tiger Moth park flyer made aero-modeling history beginning 25 January 2004 when a discussion thread at hobby website RCGroups.com proposed the Tiger Moth World Tour which involved flying the model in every state in the United States.  Modelers Gene Carr and Luis Hoyos of Thonotosassa, Florida assembled the model and monitored the sign-up list.  Trip coordinator Keith Wilson, also of Thonotosassa, was to monitor the model's journey from pilot to pilot, each of whom signed the model.  All shipping costs were incurred by the individual pilots, each of whom was responsible for getting the model shipped to its next destination.

The Tiger Moth's first flight was in Thonotosassa on 7 March 2004 with the eighty-sixth and final flight taking place on 13 July 2007 in Honolulu, Hawaii.  The model flew not only in the United States but in parts of Canada as well.  The model was feared lost in Kahoka, Missouri but was later found and turned over to the local police.

On 24 June 2008, the Academy of Model Aeronautics accepted the Tiger Moth, logbooks including a repair log which listed 42 separate repairs and all support gear for permanent display starting 27 March 2009 at their National Model Aviation Museum in Muncie, Indiana.  The news of the model's final destination was covered in the September 2009 edition of the AMA magazine, Model Aviation by assistant editor Jay Smith.

See also
 List of companies of Taiwan

External links and references

 GWS website
 GWS product line
 Smith, Jay. "World Tour Tiger Moth on Display." Model Aviation, September 2009.

Companies of Taiwan
Radio-controlled aircraft
Radio control
Manufacturing companies established in 1993
Taiwanese companies established in 1993